Hocine Yahi (born April 25, 1960 in El Madania, Algiers) is a retired Algerian international footballer who played at the 1982 FIFA World Cup.

Club career
At age 11, Yahi joined his hometown club of CR Belouizdad, where he would go on to spend his entire domestic career. During his time with the club, he won the Algerian Cup in 1978 defeating USM Alger 2-0 on penalties in the final.

In 1990, he signed with Northern Irish club Linfield F.C., with whom he won the Gold Cup and reached the final of the 1990 Floodlit Cup during his brief stint with the club.

International career
Yahi played for Algeria at the 1979 FIFA World Youth Championship in Japan, where he started in all four of Algeria's games and scored a goal in the opener against Mexico, which ended 1-1.

Yahi played for Algeria at the African Cup of Nations in four tournaments: 1982, 1984, 1986 and 1988. In four tournaments, he made 16 appearances and scored 1 goal.

In 1980, Yahi was a member of the Algerian squad at the 1980 Summer Olympics in Moscow. However, he did not make any appearances as Algeria lost 3-0 to Yugoslavia in the quarter-finals.

Yahi was a member of the Algerian squad at the 1982 FIFA World Cup in Spain. However, he made just one appearance as a substitute in the final group game against Chile, replacing Abdelmajid Bourebbou in the 31st minute. Algeria went on to win the game 3-2.

Honours
 Won the Algerian Cup once with CR Belouizdad in 1978
 Won the Northern Irish Gold Cup in 1990

References

External links
 
 

1960 births
1982 FIFA World Cup players
1982 African Cup of Nations players
1984 African Cup of Nations players
1986 African Cup of Nations players
1988 African Cup of Nations players
Algeria international footballers
Algerian expatriate footballers
Algerian footballers
Association football midfielders
CR Belouizdad players
Expatriate association footballers in Northern Ireland
Algerian expatriate sportspeople in the United Kingdom
Footballers at the 1980 Summer Olympics
Linfield F.C. players
Living people
Olympic footballers of Algeria
Competitors at the 1983 Mediterranean Games
Footballers from Algiers
Algeria youth international footballers
Mediterranean Games competitors for Algeria
21st-century Algerian people